Tingena macarella is a species of moth in the family Oecophoridae. It is endemic to New Zealand and is found on both the North and South Islands. Adults of this species are on the wing from November until February. This species is attracted to light and the larvae are litter feeders.

Taxonomy

This species was first described by Edward Meyrick in 1883 using specimens collected in Christchurch in January and named Oecophora macarella. Meyrick went on to give a more detailed description in 1884. In 1915 Meyrick placed this species within the Borkhausenia genus. In 1926 Alfred Philpott was unable to study the genitalia of the male of this species as no species were held in New Zealand collections. George Hudson discussed this species under the name B. macarella in his 1928 publication The butterflies and moths of New Zealand. In 1988 J. S. Dugdale placed this species in the genus Tingena. The male lectotype, collected in the Port Hills, is held at the Natural History Museum, London.

Description
Meyrick first described this species as follows:

Meyrick went on to do a more detailed description as follows:
Meyrick suggested that this species could be distinguished by its "pale yellow colouring, less defined basal mark on costa and the almost wholly dark fuscous thorax".

Distribution 
This species is endemic to New Zealand and has been observed on both the North and South Islands including in Wellington, Kapiti Island and Christchurch.

Behaviour 
The adults of this species are on the wing from November to February. T. macarella are attracted to light.

Hosts
The larvae of this species are litter feeders including on the litter of Festuca.

References

Oecophoridae
Moths of New Zealand
Moths described in 1883
Endemic fauna of New Zealand
Taxa named by Edward Meyrick
Endemic moths of New Zealand